The Royal Navy has had ten ships named Swiftsure since 1573, including:
 , a galleon, renamed Speedwell and rebuilt in 1607, and lost in 1624.
 , a 42-gun great ship captured by the Dutch in 1666.
 , a 70-gun ship later renamed Revenge.
 ,  a 70-gun third-rate ship of the line.
 , a 74-gun third-rate ship of the line captured by the French in 1801. Later recaptured by the Royal Navy in the Battle of Trafalgar and renamed HMS Irresistible.
 , a 74-gun third-rate ship of the line launched in 1804 which served at the Battle of Trafalgar and was sold in 1845.
 , the lead ship of her class of ironclad battleships.
 , the lead ship of her class of pre-dreadnought battleships. She served in the Mediterranean in World War I and was broken up in 1920.
 , a  light cruiser that served in the Far East in World War II.
 , the lead ship of her class of submarines. She was decommissioned in 1992 due to damage suffered to the pressure hull during trials.

Battle honours

 Armada 1588
 Cadiz 1596
 Santa Cruz 1657
 Lowestoft 1665
 Four Days' Battle 1666
 Schooneveld 1673
 Texel 1673
 Barfleur 1692
 Vigo 1702
 Gibraltar 1704
 Velez Malaga 1704
 Lagos 1759
 Quiberon Bay 1759
 Belle Isle 1761
 Nile 1798
 Egypt 1801
 Trafalgar 1805
 Suez Canal 1915
 Dardanelles 1915–16
 Okinawa 1945

References
 

Royal Navy ship names